Saint Michael Choniates (or Acominatus; ; c. 1140 – 1220) was a Byzantine Greek writer and cleric, born at Chonae (the ancient Colossae). At an early age he studied at Constantinople and was the pupil of Eustathius of Thessalonica. Around 1175 he was appointed archbishop of Athens, a position which he retained until 1204. In 1204, he defended the Acropolis of Athens from attack by Leo Sgouros, holding out until the arrival of the Crusaders in 1205, to whom he surrendered the city. After the establishment of Latin control, he retired to the island of Ceos. Around 1217 he moved again to the monastery of Vodonitsa near Thermopylae, where he died.

Though he is known to classical scholars as the last possessor of complete versions of Callimachus' Hecale and Aitia, he was a versatile writer, and composed homilies, speeches and poems, which, with his correspondence, throw considerable light upon the condition of Attica and Athens at the time. His memorial to Alexios III Angelos on the abuses of Byzantine administration, the poetical lament over the degeneracy of Athens and the monodies on his brother Nicetas and Eustathius, archbishop of Thessalonica, deserve special mention.

It is believed that his daughter Constantina tutored, in Greek and science, John of Basingstoke, Archdeacon of Leicester known for his fluency in and advocacy of the Greek language. Michael's pupil George Bardanes, who had accompanied him during his exile on Ceos, became a distinguished bishop in subsequent years.

Notes

References
Edition of his works by Spyridon Lambros (1879-1880)
Migne, Patrologia Graeca, cxL.
Adolf Ellissen, Michael Akominatos (1846), containing several pieces with German translation
Ferdinand Gregorovius, Geschichte der Stadt Athen im Mittelalter, i, (1889)
George Finlay, History of Greece, iv. pp. 133–134 (1877).
 Thallon, C. A Medieval Humanist: Michael Akominatos (New Haven, 1923) (reprint New York, 1973).
 Stadtmüller, G. "Michael Choniates, Metropolit von Athen," Orientalia Christiana, 33,2 (1934), 125–325.
 Setton, K. M. "Athens in the Later Twelfth Century," Speculum, XIX (1944), 179–207.
 Anthony Kaldellis, "Michael Choniates: a classicist-bishop and his cathedral (1182–1205 AD)," in Idem, The Christian Parthenon: Classicism and Pilgrimage in Byzantine Athens (Cambridge, Cambridge University Press, 2009), 145–162.
Nario Gallina, "La reazione antiromana nell'epistolario di Michele Coniata Metropolita d'Atene" in Gherardo Ortalli, Giorgio Ravegnani, Peter Schreiner, eds. Quarta Crociata (Venice, 2006. ) vol. 1 pp. 423–446

Athanasios Angelou, «Rhetoric and History: The case of Nicetas Choniates», στο History as Literature in Byzantium, ed. Ruth Macrides, Farnham, Ashgate 2010, σ. 289–305.

1140s births
1220 deaths
12th-century Byzantine bishops
13th-century Byzantine bishops
12th-century Byzantine writers
13th-century Byzantine writers
Bishops of Athens
Book and manuscript collectors
Byzantine Anatolians
Byzantine Athenians
Byzantine writers
Christians of the Fourth Crusade
Kea (island)
People from Colossae